Narcisse Ekanga Amia (born 30 July 1987) is a former professional footballer who played as a midfielder. Born in Cameroon, he made eight appearances for the Equatorial Guinea national team.

His year of birth is not clear since he was registered as born in 1981 by the Cameroonian Football Federation, as well as born in 1985 and 1987 by FIFA. He usually competes with the latter. He was referred in his natal Cameroon as an age defrauder.

Club career
Ekanga played for TP Mazembe in the 2009 FIFA Club World Cup and 2010 FIFA Club World Cup, where they reached the final losing 3–0 to Inter Milan.

International career
Ekanga debuted with Equatorial Guinea on 7 September 2011 in a friendly match against Central African Republic in Malabo.

References

External links
 
 
 
 
 

Living people
Year of birth uncertain
Equatoguinean people of Cameroonian descent
Naturalized citizens of Equatorial Guinea
Equatoguinean footballers
Cameroonian footballers
Association football midfielders
Equatorial Guinea international footballers
2012 Africa Cup of Nations players
Les Astres players
TP Mazembe players
Al-Hilal Club (Omdurman) players
Leones Vegetarianos FC players
Buildcon F.C. players
Expatriate footballers in the Democratic Republic of the Congo
Expatriate footballers in Sudan
Expatriate footballers in Turkey
Expatriate footballers in Zambia
1987 births